Émile Bréhier (12 April 1876, Bar-le-Duc – 3 February 1952, Paris) was a French philosopher. His interest was in classical philosophy, and the history of philosophy. He wrote a Histoire de la Philosophie, translated into English in seven volumes. This work inspired Fred Copleston's own History of Philosophy (1946-1975), comprising nine volumes.

Life
Bréhier studied at the University of Paris. In 1908 he received his doctorate at the Sorbonne with a dissertation about Philo of Alexandria. From 1910 to 1912 he was Master of Philosophical Conferences at the University of Rennes, and professor of philosophy at the University of Bordeaux from 1912 to 1914.  He was Henri Bergson's successor at the University of Paris in 1945. The historian Louis Bréhier was his brother.

In 1914 Bréhier became a sub-lieutenant in the 344th Infantry Regiment; he was made knight of the  Légion d'honneur.

Philosophical work
He was an early follower of Bergson; in the 1930s there was an influential view that Bergsonism and Neoplatonism were linked.

He has been called "the sole figure in the French history who adopts an Hegelian interpretation of Neoplatonism", but also a Neo-Kantian opponent of Hegel.

Works
 Les idées philosophiques et religieuses de Philon d'Alexandrie (1908)
 La Théorie des incorporels dans l'ancien stoïcisme, Paris, Librairie Alphonse Picard & fils, (1907).
 Schelling (1912)
 Histoire de la philosophie allemande (1921)
 La Philosophie de Plotin
 Plotin: Ennéades (with French translation), Collection Budé, 1924–1938
 Histoire de la philosophie – I Antiquité et moyen âge (three volumes), II La philosophie moderne (four volumes)
 La philosophie du moyen âge (1949)
 Le monde byzantin – la civilisation byzantine (1950)
 Chrysippe et l'ancien stoïcisme (Paris, 1951)
 Histoire de la philosophie allemande, 3rd edition updated by Paul Ricœur (1954).
 Études de philosophie antique (1955)

He contributed the articles "Philo Judaeus", and "Stoics and Stoic Philosophy" to the Catholic Encyclopedia.

Notes

References
 Alan D. Schrift (2006), Twentieth-Century French Philosophy: Key Themes And Thinkers, p. 107.

External links

 IDIH page
 Biography 
 Oeuvres sur les classiques des sciences sociales  

1876 births
1952 deaths
20th-century French historians
French military personnel of World War I
People from Bar-le-Duc
University of Paris alumni
Academic staff of the University of Paris
French male non-fiction writers
Contributors to the Catholic Encyclopedia
Corresponding Fellows of the British Academy